Gerald (Jerry) Leroy Willet (October 31, 1934 – September 10, 2017) was an American politician, businessman, and heavy equipment operator.

Willet was born in Duluth, Minnesota. He grew up on a farm in rural Laporte, MN and graduated from Laporte High School in Laporte, Minnesota in 1952. After high school, he traveled the United States working as a heavy equipment operator until 1964. He then moved his family back to Minnesota where he owned and operated a furniture store in Park Rapids, Minnesota. He served on the Civil Air Patrol. Willet served in the Minnesota Senate from 1971 to 1988 and was a Democrat. He was then appointed by the Governor, Rudy Perpich, as the Commissioner of the Minnesota Pollution Control Agency. Willet died at the Frazee Care Center in Frazee, Minnesota.

Notes

1934 births
2017 deaths
Politicians from Duluth, Minnesota
People from Park Rapids, Minnesota
People of the Civil Air Patrol
Businesspeople from Minnesota
Democratic Party Minnesota state senators
20th-century American businesspeople